Marc Camoletti (12 August 1857 - 13 December 1940) was a Swiss architect.

Camoletti was born in Cartigny.  He designed the Museum of art and history in Geneva.  He died in Geneva, aged 83.

References 

Swiss architects
1857 births
1940 deaths